Results of the Spain national basketball team since 1935, as recognized by the Spanish Basketball Federation: Olympic Games, World Cups, EuroBaskets and the respective qualifying tournaments, as well as seven editions of the Mediterranean Games when the A-team was involved. Also included, friendly games and tournaments against national teams, including nine games of the unofficial 1966 "Extraordinary" World Championship, and five in the 1990 Goodwill Games.

Note: updated through 14 November 2022

See also 
 Spain national basketball team
 Spanish Basketball Federation
 Spain national youth basketball teams
 Basketball at the Summer Olympics
 FIBA Basketball World Cup
 FIBA EuroBasket

References

External links 

 Official website
 Spanish Basketball Federation website
 FIBA profile
 EuroBasket.com profile

Spain national basketball team